Shawn Stephen Anderson (born February 7, 1968) is a Canadian former professional ice hockey defenceman who played eight seasons in the National Hockey League (NHL) for the Buffalo Sabres, Quebec Nordiques, Washington Capitals and Philadelphia Flyers.

As a youth, he played in the 1980 and 1981 Quebec International Pee-Wee Hockey Tournaments with a minor ice hockey team from LaSalle, Quebec.

Career statistics

References

External links
 

1968 births
Augsburger Panther players
Baltimore Skipjacks players
Buffalo Sabres draft picks
Buffalo Sabres players
Canadian ice hockey defencemen
Halifax Citadels players
Hershey Bears players
Iserlohn Roosters players
Kalamazoo Wings (1974–2000) players
Living people
Maine Black Bears men's ice hockey players
Manitoba Moose (IHL) players
Milwaukee Admirals (IHL) players
National Hockey League first-round draft picks
Nürnberg Ice Tigers players
Philadelphia Flyers players
Quebec Nordiques players
Revier Löwen players
Rochester Americans players
Ice hockey people from Montreal
Utah Grizzlies (IHL) players
Washington Capitals players
Wedemark Scorpions players
Canadian expatriate ice hockey players in Germany
Canadian expatriate ice hockey players in the United States